Vicious Circle are an Australian hardcore punk band, which formed in 1983 and included founding members Paul Lindsay on lead vocals and Les Rumincik on lead guitar. They disbanded in 1990 and Lindsay and Rumincik formed Rue Morgue in the following year. Rue Morgue issued two albums, Soul Museum (1993) and Freak Nation (1995), before Lindsay and Rumincik revived Vicious Circle in 1995. That group's albums are Price of Progress (1985), Reflections (1986), Into the Void (1988), Reactivate (compilation album, 1995), Internal Headstrength (1997) and Perfect World Disaster (1999).

History 

Vicious Circle formed in late 1983 as a hardcore punk band in Melbourne by Alby Brovedani on bass guitar and guitar (ex-Politburo), Paul Lindsay on lead vocals, Les Rumincik on lead guitar (ex-Politburo) and Michael on drums. Michael was replaced on drums by Russell Hopkinson in 1984. Two early tracks, "Blood Race" and "Police Brutality" appeared on a Various Artists compilation album, Eat Your Head (1984) via No Master's Voice, which was re-released on CD in 1997 by Au Go Go Records. The group's debut five-track extended play, Search for the Solution, appeared in early 1985 via Reactor Records, which was owned by Phil McDougall.

The hardcore group followed with their first studio album, Price of Progress, in September 1985 also on Reactor. According to Australian musicologist, Ian McFarlane, it was "a ground-breaking release in the annals of the local hardcore scene." The album was also issued by Children of the Revolution record label in the United States and Europe. From their US contacts they teamed up with American punk rockers, Youth Brigade to issue a split album Epitaph/Care in April 1986. They released their first single, "A Nightmare so Quick", in that month. By that time David Ross had replaced Hopkinson on drums and Keith Chatham joined on bass guitar to allow Brovedani to focus on rhythm guitar.

Reflections, Vicious Circle's second album appeared in October 1986 via Reactor in Australia and on Boner in the US. McFarlane noticed it had "elements of melody seeping into the band's all-out thrash approach." The Australian hardcore band toured the US for three months, supporting gigs by GBH, Agnostic Front, MDC or Attitude Adjustment. Upon return to Melbourne at the end of that year Ross was replaced on drums by James Lynch. The group's last work for Reactor, Hope and Wait, was an EP issued in September 1987. They were signed to Sydney-based label, Waterfront Records in 1988, Lindsay explained, "the decision to go to Waterfront was made whilst [McDougall] was still running Reactor, I know because I told him."

Vicious Circle's studio album, Into the Void, was released on Waterfront in February 1988. RebelSynner of The Corroseum observed, "it's perhaps the most enjoyable [album] for Metal fans". The group continued until 1990 when they disbanded.

Rue Morgue years 

Rue Morgue were formed by Lindsay and Rumincik in 1991 as an "eclectic mix of hardcore punk, death metal and skate-core." Other members were Danny O'Callaghan on drums, Gary Proghoulis on bass guitar and Peter on guitar. They provided the track, "Romance of Death", for the Various Artists' compilation Redrum (June 1993) via the Australian branch of Roadrunner Records. Soul Museum, their debut album, was issued late in 1993 via Def Records. A second album, Freak Nation, followed in January 1995 but Lindsay and Rumincik re-established Vicious Circle in mid-year.

Reformation and later years 

With Vicious Circle's reformation they released a compilation album, Reactivate, in July 1995 on Def Records. They followed with a four-track EP of new material, Fixated, on Spent Records/Shock Records in March 1993. Internal Headstrength, their first album after the reunion, appeared in June 1996 with Lindsay and Rumincik joined by Gary on guitar, Chris on bass guitar (ex-Buttjuice) and Stu on drums. Their next album, Perfect World Disaster, was issued via Resist Records in 1999. For the album, Born Yesterday (2006), the line-up was Lindsay, Proghoulis, Rumincik and Daniel Ostojic. By Don't Lose It (2012) Lindsay was joined by Adam Shirley on guitar and vocals and Ash Newman on drums.

Members 

 Alby Brovedani – bass guitar, rhythm guitar 
 Paul Lindsay – lead vocals 
 Les Rumincik – lead guitar 
 Michael – drums 
 Russell Hopkinson – drums 
 Keith Chatham – bass guitar 
 David Ross – drums 
 James Lynch – drums 
 Gary Proghoulis – guitar 
 Chris – bass guitar
 Stu – drums
 Ash Newman – drums 
 Adam Shirley – guitar, vocals

Rue Morgue
 Paul Lindsay – lead vocals 
 Danny O'Callaghan – drums 
 Gary Proghoulis – bass guitar 
 Les Rumincik – lead guitar 
 Peter – guitar

Discography

Albums 

 Price of Progress (September 1985) – Reactor Records 
 Epitaph/Care  (split album, April 1986) – Reactor Records 
 Reflections (11 February 1986) – Reactor Records 
 Into the Void (10 February 1988) – Waterfront Records 
 Reactivate (compilation album, July 1995) – Def Records 
 Internal Headstrength (13 June 1996) – Spent Records 
 Perfect World Disaster (1999) – Resist Records 
 Switched On (2000) – Circlework Records 
 Born Yesterday (2006) – Circlework Records
 Only the Brave (2008) – Circlework Records
 Don't Lose It (2012) – Circlework Records
 Knucklehead (2013) – Circlework Records
 Never Give In (2015) – Circlework Records
 Born to Destroy (2017) – Circlework Records

Extended plays 

 Search for the Solution (February 1985) – Reactor Records 
 Hope and Wait (September 1987) – Reactor Records 
 Fixated (March 1996) – Spent Records/Shock Records

References 

1983 establishments in Australia
Australian hardcore punk groups
Musical groups established in 1983
Musical groups disestablished in 1990
Musical groups reestablished in 1995
Musical groups from Melbourne